Hipponix incurvus is a species of small sea snail, a marine gastropod mollusk in the family Hipponicidae, the hoof snails. Until recently this species was considered to be a species of Capulus in the Capulidae but was reclassified by Simone (2002)

Distribution
This species occurs in the Atlantic Ocean from North Carolina to Brazil.

Description 
The maximum recorded shell length is 17 mm.

Habitat 
Minimum recorded depth is 0 m. Maximum recorded depth is 538 m.

References

External links
 Rosenberg, G.; Moretzsohn, F.; García, E. F. (2009). Gastropoda (Mollusca) of the Gulf of Mexico, Pp. 579–699 in: Felder, D.L. and D.K. Camp (eds.), Gulf of Mexico–Origins, Waters, and Biota. Texas A&M Press, College Station, Texas

Hipponicidae
Gastropods described in 1791
Taxa named by Johann Friedrich Gmelin